Jingo de Lunch is  a German punk band from Kreuzberg, Berlin. Most members had already  a solid musical background, for instance Sepp Ehrensberger had played in the Berliner cult punk rock band called Vorkriegsjugend (1984–85), and also in Zerstörte Jugend with Tom Schwoll. Yvonne Ducksworth (a Canadian who arrived in Germany in 1983) had previously sung in Combat Not Conform.  Before they gave birth to Jingo de Lunch in April 1987, with the help of Steve Hahn (on drums) and Henning Menke (bass), Tom Schwoll (guitar);  Ehrensberger (guitar) and Ducksworth (vocals) played together in Manson Youth.

Career
In 1987 Jingo de Lunch released their debut album Perpetuum Mobile,  three months after their first rehearsal. Their second LP, Axe To Grind, was recorded in 1989. With their third album Underdog, they took a new artistic direction and moved away from their underground roots by signing with the major record label, Phonogram Records. Two other albums released were B.Y.E and Deja Voodoo, before they broke up in 1996. Jingo de Lunch were regarded as a forerunner of crossover music: punk, hardcore, hard rock and rock. They toured many times in Europe and played with The Ramones, Bad Brains, Die Toten Hosen and Bad Religion.

After they split, Steve Hahn worked as a roadie for Toten Hosen and Beatsteaks. Tom Schwoll, who left the band in 1994, played with many other bands which included Extrabreit, Kumpelbasis, Sin City Circus Ladies', Die Skeptiker and The Subjects. Henning Menke played with Ojo Rojo from 1999 onwards, and he also played with Church Of Confidence, and Die Skeptiker. In 2005 he joined Skew Siskin. Ehrensberger played in various other bands such as like Bad Brians, 'Riff Raff and Bomb Texas. Ducksworth went to live in Arizona, United States from 1996 to 2006, but she did not take part in any band.

In 2006, Jingo de Lunch played two reunion shows at the White Trash Fast Food in Berlin. In 2007, they released The Independent Years:  a compilation album with songs from their first two albums; plus a cover version of Subhumans' "Fuck You", and the rare 12 inch "Cursed Earth".

In September 2007, they celebrated their 20th anniversary as a band by touring in various cities of Germany and Italy. In early 2008, Ehrenseberger left the band, and was replaced by Tico Zamora.

At the end of 2009, Schwoll and Zamora left the band, and were replaced by Gary Schmalzl. In early 2010, they played six shows in Germany. In October 2010, they released a new album, Land of the Free-ks.  Then, they toured Germany and Europe.

In September 2011, they released a live album "Live in Kreuzberg"  recorded  at the  Lido in Kreuzberg (Berlin)on 25 November 2010.

In 2012, they had 5 concerts in Germany. They officially broke up in September 2012. Their last  show  was at the Ruhrpott Rodeo Festival on 26 May 2012.

Current members 

 Vocals : Yvonne Ducksworth 
 Guitar : Gary Schmalzl
 Drums : Steve Hahn 
 Bass : Henning Menke

Previous members 

 Sepp Ehrenseberger (1987-1996 then 2006-2008)
 Guitar : Tom Schwoll (1987-1994 then 2006-2009)
 Guitar : Tico Zamora (2008–2009)

Discography

Albums 

 1987 Perpetuum Mobile (We bite Records) 
 1989 Axe To Grind (Hellhound)
 1990 Underdog (Phonogram)
 1991 B.Y.E (Phonogram)
 1994 Deja Voodoo (Vertigo)
 2007 The Independent Years (Rookie Records)
 2010 Land of the Free-ks (Noise-O-Lution.)
 2011 Live in Kreuzberg (Noise-O-Lution.)

Mini LP 
1988 Cursed Earth (12") (Bonzen Records)

Maxi CD 

 1990 Crawl (Phonogram)
 1994 Dogs Day (Phonogram)

External links
Jingo-de-lunch.com

Deutschpunk
Musical groups established in 1987
German hardcore punk groups
Vertigo Records artists
People from Friedrichshain-Kreuzberg
Musical groups from Berlin